SimGrid is a toolkit that provides core functionalities for the simulation of distributed applications in heterogeneous distributed environments. The specific goal of the project is to facilitate research in the area of parallel and distributed large scale systems, such as Grids, P2P systems and Cloud. Its use cases encompass heuristic evaluation, application prototyping or even real application development and tuning.

See also
 BIGSIM

References

External links
 SimGrid - official project homepage

SimGrid, Casanova, H., Legrand, A. and Quinson, M., SimGrid: a Generic Framework for Large-Scale Distributed Experiments,
10th IEEE International Conference on Computer Modeling and Simulation, 2008.

Distributed computing